Kamenka is a rural locality (a khutor) in Starovedugskoye Rural Settlement, Semiluksky District, Voronezh Oblast, Russia. The population was 120 as of 2010. There are 2 streets.

Geography 
Kamenka is located 57 km northwest of Semiluki (the district's administrative centre) by road. Staraya Veduga is the nearest rural locality.

References 

Rural localities in Semiluksky District